A nursery is usually, in American connotations, a bedroom within a house or other dwelling set aside for an infant or toddler. A typical nursery would contain a cradle or a crib (or similar type of bed), a table or platform for the purpose of changing diapers (also known as a changing table), a rocking chair, as well as various items required for the care of the child (such as baby powder and medicine). A nursery is generally designated for the smallest bedroom in the house, as a baby requires very little space until at least walking age; the premise being that the room is used almost exclusively for sleep. However, the room in many cases could remain the bedroom of the child well into his or her teenage years, or until a younger sibling is born, and the parents decide to move the older child into another larger bedroom, if one should be available.

In Edwardian times, for the wealthy and mid-tier classes, a nursery was a suite of rooms at the top of a house, including the night nursery, where the children slept, and a day nursery, where they ate and played, or a combination thereof. The nursery suite would include some bathroom facilities and possibly a small kitchen. The nurse (nanny) and nursemaid (assistant) slept in the suite too, to be within earshot of the sleeping children. The schoolroom might also be adjacent, but the governess, whose job it was to teach the children, would not be part of the nursery; she would have her own bedroom, possibly in another wing. Fictional portrayals of nurseries abound, for example in the writings of Kipling and E. Nesbit; perhaps the most famous nursery is that in the 1964 Disney live action and animated film Mary Poppins, or the nursery in the 1953 Disney animated film Peter Pan and the nursery in Jim Henson's Muppet Babies.

External links

Rooms

How to recreate a dreamy Child’s Room
Wall decoration children’s room